Austrodyptornithes is a clade of birds that include the orders Sphenisciformes (penguins) and Procellariiformes (tube-nosed seabirds). A 2014 analysis of whole genomes of 48 representative bird species concluded that penguins are the sister group of Procellariiformes, from which they diverged about 60 million years ago.

References

Neognathae